Aravinda Bala Pajanor (5 December 1935  20 March 2013; also spelled Aravinda Bala Pazhanoor) was an Indian politician, lawyer, and former minister of Petroleum and Natural Gas in the government of India. He was elected to the 5th and 6th Lok Sabha from Puducherry parliamentary constituency. A member of the All India Anna Dravida Munnetra Kazhagam (AIADMK), he was the first politician of AIADMK party who was elected as union minister.

Biography 
He was born to Appasamy Pajanor on 5 December 1935 at Karaikal town in Pondicherry, India. He received his education from St. Mary's Matriculation High School, Karaikal, St. Joseph's College, Tiruchirappalli, and Loyola College, Chennai. He later attended Dr. Ambedkar Government Law College, Chennai where he obtained his B.L. degree.

He also served as a chairperson of Sports Council, Pondicherry and president of students' union, in addition to serving as a lawyer at the Madras High Court.

Personal life 
He was married to Freeda Gajalakshmi Pajanor, with whom he had two children. After retiring from the politics, he moved to the United States where he spent most of his time after retirement. He died in US on 20 March 2013 due to ageing.

References 

1935 births
2013 deaths
People from Pondicherry
St Joseph's College, Tiruchirappalli alumni
Loyola College, Chennai alumni
India MPs 1971–1977
India MPs 1977–1979
Petroleum and Natural Gas Ministers of India
All India Anna Dravida Munnetra Kazhagam politicians
Puducherry politicians